This is a list of all roster changes that occurred prior to the 2020–21 I-League season.

Player movement and other transactions

Team changes

Released players
This list includes players who were released from their club and who have yet to sign with another I-League club or who have left the league.

References

roster changes